The Guildford Dudley Sr. and Anne Dallas House is a historic house in Forest Hills, Tennessee, United States.

History
The house was built in 1928 for Guildford Dudley Sr, a co-founder of the Life and Casualty Insurance Company of Tennessee, and his wife, Anne Dallas Dudley. Mrs. Dudley was a supporter of women's suffrage in Tennessee. Their son, Guilford Dudley, served as the United States ambassador to Denmark from 1969 to 1971.

The house was purchased by Otto Linderberg and his wife Louise in 1935, and later inherited by Elise and Enid Lindenberg. Elise and her husband, P. D. Houston, who was the president of the First American National Bank, moved into the P. D. Houston Jr. House, and the Dallas house was sold to Paul Montcastle and his wife Lucy in 1951. Montcastle was the president of the Life and Casualty Insurance Company.

Architectural significance
The house was designed in the Tudor Revival architectural style by Dougherty & Gardner. It has been listed on the National Register of Historic Places since October 23, 2003.

References

National Register of Historic Places in Davidson County, Tennessee
Tudor Revival architecture in the United States
Gothic Revival architecture in Tennessee
Houses completed in 1928